Severgin may refer to:

 Vasily Severgin (1765–1826), Russian chemist, mineralogist, and geologist
 Pik Severgin, volcano on Kharimkotan island
Severgin Bay, on the Kuril Islands